The eighth season of the Canadian television comedy series Video on Trial premiered on MuchMusic (later renamed Much) on January 23, 2013 and concluded on March 23, 2014. It consists of 24 episodes.

Background
Video on Trial features music videos being humorously critiqued in a manner akin to a courtroom trial. The show's tongue-in-cheek manifesto, as announced in its original opening sequence, is seeing to it that "all music videos are brought to justice". A typical half-hour episode features five music videos being "tried" by a panel of five personalities acting as jurors.

The eighth season of Video on Trial retains the abridged episode format introduced midway through the fifth season. Additionally, season eight was the final Video on Trial season to follow the basic premise of five music videos being tried by five jurors, which had been retained since the inception of the series. The ninth and final season would significantly revamp the show's format, eliminating the rotating panel of jurors altogether.

Episodes

References

2013 Canadian television seasons
2014 Canadian television seasons